Manja is a district of Menabe in Madagascar approximately 70 km in the south of the capitol Morondava.

Municipalities
The district is further divided into six communes:

 Andranopasy
 Ankiliabo
 Anontsibe  Centre
 Beharona
 Manja
 Soaserana

Rivers
The Mangoky River in the south and the Sakalava River.

References 

Districts of Menabe